Balloon is an historic community located in York County, South Carolina, United States. It was founded in 1889 and abandoned in 1903.

See also
Former populated places in York County, South Carolina

Sources
 1998/South Carolina POs/Meher/pg 3
 Balloon, South Carolina. Geographic Names Information System, U.S. Geological Survey.

Populated places in York County, South Carolina
Former populated places in South Carolina
Populated places established in 1889
Populated places disestablished in 1903